Fabrice Le Vigoureux (born 27 August 1969) is a French politician and member of Renaissance. In June 2017, he was elected to serve as Deputy for the 1st constituency of Calvados in the French National Assembly. He was reelected for a second term at the 2022 French legislative election.

See also
 French legislative elections 2017

References

1969 births
Living people
Deputies of the 15th National Assembly of the French Fifth Republic
Deputies of the 16th National Assembly of the French Fifth Republic
La République En Marche! politicians
Politicians from Caen
University of Caen Normandy alumni
Academic staff of the University of Caen Normandy